Urho Nissilä (born 4 April 1996) is a Finnish professional footballer who plays as a midfielder for South Korean club Suwon FC.

Club career

KuPS

Nissilä began his senior club career playing for KuPS.

Zulte Waregem

He signed with Zulte Waregem in 2018. He made his debut on 10 November, playing the first 58 minutes of a 2–0 win against Lokeren.

Return to KuPS

He returned to KuPS on loan in February 2020.

Suwon FC
Nissilä joined K League 1 side Suwon FC in January 2022.

International career
He has represented the Finland national under-21 football team.

He made his debut for the Finland national football team on 1 September 2021 in a friendly against Wales. He substituted Jasin-Amin Assehnoun at half-time of a 0–0 home draw. Three days later he gained his first cap in FIFA World Cup qualifications when he replaced Onni Valakari as a substitute on 78th minute in Helsinki Olympic Stadium in a match against Kazakhstan.

Career statistics

International

.

References

External links

 MVV Maastricht official profile
 Urho Nissilä – SPL competition record

1996 births
Living people
Finnish footballers
Finnish expatriate footballers
Association football midfielders
Finland youth international footballers
Finland under-21 international footballers
Finland international footballers
Kuopion Palloseura players
S.V. Zulte Waregem players
MVV Maastricht players
Veikkausliiga players
Belgian Pro League players
Eerste Divisie players
Finnish expatriate sportspeople in Belgium
Finnish expatriate sportspeople in the Netherlands
Expatriate footballers in Belgium
Expatriate footballers in the Netherlands
Suwon FC players
Finnish expatriate sportspeople in South Korea
Expatriate footballers in South Korea
People from Kuopio
Sportspeople from North Savo